Fulgenzio is a male given name. Notable people with this name include:

Fulgenzio Gallucci (1570–1632), Italian Roman Catholic prelate
Fulgenzio Manfredi (–1610), Italian Franciscan friar
Fulgenzio Micanzio (1570–1654), Italian biographer and Servite friar
Fulgenzio Mondini, Italian Baroque painter
Fulgenzio Arminio Monforte (1620–1680), Italian Roman Catholic prelate
Fulgenzio Vitman (1728–1806), Italian clergyman and botanist

See also